Dichromia occatus is a moth of the family Erebidae first described by Frederic Moore in 1882. It is found in the Indian subregion, Sri Lanka, Taiwan, Japan, Korea, Laos, Borneo, the Philippines, Sulawesi, Java and Bali.

Forewings ashy grey. There is a fine triarcuate, oblique postmedial. Antemedial irregularly angled. Apical patch stepped, dentate, zigzag.

References

Moths of Asia
Moths described in 1882
Erebidae
Hypeninae